Nino Vaccarella (4 March 1933 – 23 September 2021) was an Italian sports car racing and Formula One driver.

His principal achievements include having won the 1964 24 Hours of Le Mans, and the Targa Florio in 1965, 1971 and 1975, the latter year when it no longer was a World Sportscar Championship event.

Sports car career

Sicily-born Vaccarella was well known for being a Targa Florio specialist. According to Vic Elford "he knew the roads on Sicily like the back of his hand". He was teamed with Umberto Maglioli for the 1960 Targa Florio in a birdcage Maserati, which was owned by the Camoradi team. Maglioli had previously won the race twice; Vaccarella was a schoolteacher in Palermo with a great passion for motorsport. They took the lead in the early afternoon on 8 May and maintained it for three laps until the car broke down. The event was won by Joakim Bonnier and Hans Herrmann in a small silver Porsche. Vaccarella was paired with Lorenzo Bandini in the 1965 Targa Florio when they won with an average speed of 63.7 miles per hour, finishing in 7 hours and 1 minute. 12.4 seconds. In 1966 Vaccarella and Bandini led most of the race until their Ferrari 330 ran off the track after seven laps and was too damaged to continue. While waving his hand to acknowledge the crowd, Vaccarella made eye contact with a retaining wall that carried the inscription Viva Nino. Maglioli and Vaccarella drove a Ford GT-40 to fifth place in the 1967 12 Hours of Sebring. 
The 8 May 1968 edition of Giornale Di Sicilia proclaimed in its headline, Only Vaccarella Can Bring Off The Miracle. The meaning had to do with the Sicilian driver's great task of gaining victory in the Targa Florio in his 2.5-litre Alfa Romeo, called the Tipo 33. He was up against four German competitors who were driving Porsche 910 models. The Porsches had recently swept the endurance races at Daytona and Sebring. Few experts gave the four Alfa Romeos much of a chance against the flawless Porsches, but Sicilians were trusting the skill of Vaccarella's driving. Vaccarella qualified eighth for the 1970 24 Hours of Daytona in a Ferrari 512S. He also drove the big V12-powered Ferrari 512S in a heroic yet ultimately losing effort in 1970, damaging the car in the final stages.
This was one of a series of 11 endurance events held in Europe and North America for the 1970 world manufacturers championship. Vaccarella and Toine Hezemans won the 1971 Targa Florio in an Alfa Romeo. They crossed the finish line over a minute ahead of Andrea de Adamich and Gijs van Lennep, who also drove an Alfa Romeo. This race ended the dominance of Porsche, which had finished first in the previous five Targa Florio races. Vaccarella competed in the 1972 12 Hours of Sebring in one of four Alfa Romeo 33/3TT's to be entered in the event. His driving partner was Nanni Galli. They qualified fifth after another Alfa Romeo of Rolf Stommelen and Peter Revson, who started third.

Formula One
Vacarella was selected for the 1962 Ferrari Formula One race team by Enzo Ferrari. He was joined by John Surtees, Mike Parkes, Willy Mairesse, Bandini, and Ludovico Scarfiotti. He participated in five World Championship Grands Prix, debuting on 10 September 1961. He scored no championship points. He also participated in several non-Championship Formula One races.

Racing record

Complete Formula One World Championship results
(key)

Non-Championship results
(key) (Races in bold indicate pole position)
(Races in italics indicate fastest lap)

Complete 24 Hours of Le Mans results

Complete 12 Hours of Sebring results

Complete 24 Hours of Daytona results

References

1933 births
2021 deaths
Sportspeople from Palermo
Italian racing drivers
Italian Formula One drivers
Scuderia Serenissima Formula One drivers
Ferrari Formula One drivers
24 Hours of Le Mans drivers
24 Hours of Le Mans winning drivers
World Sportscar Championship drivers
24 Hours of Daytona drivers
12 Hours of Sebring drivers
12 Hours of Reims drivers